Declan McCavana (born 1963) is a French language scholar and professor from Northern Ireland.

Career
Declan McCavana was born in Belfast, Northern Ireland in 1963.  He attended St. Mary's Christian Brothers' Grammar School, Belfast and then Trinity College Dublin from which he obtained a B.A. (Hons) in French.

He then moved to France where he initially taught as a ‘lecteur d’anglais’ at the Sorbonne and at Ecole Normale Supérieure. He then obtained a post as President of the French Debating Society (ENSAE).

Awards
 2015: MBE  For services to the promotion of the English language in France

References

1963 births
Living people
People educated at St. Mary's Christian Brothers' Grammar School, Belfast
Alumni of Trinity College Dublin